The 12th District of the Iowa House of Representatives in the state of Iowa.

Current elected officials
Brian Best is the representative currently representing the district.

Past representatives
The district has previously been represented by:
 Luvern W. Kehe, 1971–1973
 Lowell Norland, 1973–1983
 Josephine Gruhn, 1983–1993
 Don Gries, 1993–1999
 Clarence Hoffman, 1999–2003
 Linda Upmeyer, 2003–2013
 Dan Muhlbauer, 2013–2015
 Brian Best, 2015–present

References

012